Free city may refer to:

Historical places 
 Free city (antiquity) a self-governed city during the Hellenistic and Roman Imperial eras
 Free imperial city, self-governed city in the Holy Roman Empire subordinate only to the emperor
 Free City of Augsburg, for over 500 years in what is now Germany
 Free City of Besançon, in what is now eastern France
 Free City of Bremen, from 1646 to 1871, with the name still officially surviving, in what is now Germany
 Free City of Frankfurt, for almost five centuries until 1866, in what is now Germany
 Free City of Hamburg, until 1871, with the name still officially surviving, in what is now Germany
 Free City of Lübeck, from 1226 to 1937 in what is now Germany
 Free City of Cracow, 1815–1846, in what is now Poland
 Free City of Danzig and Free City of Danzig (Napoleonic), two historical city-states that existed in what is now Gdańsk, Poland

Other uses
 Free City (album), a 2001 album by the St. Lunatics
 Free City of Greyhawk, a fictional city-state
 Free City, a fictional MMO game in the 2021 film Free Guy

See also
 Free state (disambiguation)
 Freetown (disambiguation)
 City-state, a sovereign microstate that usually consists of a single city and its dependent territories
 Independent city, a city or town that does not form part of another general-purpose local government entity 
 Royal free city, in the Kingdom of Hungary
 Special economic zone, an area in which the business and trade laws are different from the rest of the country
 Pact of Free Cities, 2019 pact between Prague, Bratislava, Warsaw, and Budapest